IMC Technologies is technology company headquartered in Athens, Greece. Founded in 2004, by Panos Georgolios, Konstantinos Kafentzis and George Papavassiliou, IMC Technologies provides knowledge management software. Its products include edialogos, knowledge accelerator and appweevr.

In 2008, IMC Technologies founder Panos Georgolios was awarded the  Young Entrepreneur Award by the Athens Chamber of Commerce and Industry Company revenue at that time had increased more than 300% since its beginning.

References

Companies based in Athens
2004 establishments in Greece